Palash Kumar is an Indian mathematician. He holds a position at the  Indian Statistical Institute.

He was awarded in 2011 the   Shanti Swarup Bhatnagar Prize for Science and Technology, the highest science award in India,  in the mathematical sciences category.

References

20th-century Indian mathematicians
Living people
Year of birth missing (living people)
Recipients of the Shanti Swarup Bhatnagar Award in Mathematical Science